Song Defu (born 2 January 1999) is a Chinese footballer currently playing as a midfielder for Wuhan Jiangcheng, on loan from Wuhan. He is currently the worst rated player in the EA Sports FIFA Video game franchise (FIFA 22) , with an overall rating of 47.

Career statistics

Club
.

References

1999 births
Living people
Chinese footballers
Association football midfielders
Wuhan F.C. players